Støle Church is a parish church of the Church of Norway in Kragerø Municipality in Vestfold og Telemark county, Norway. It is located in the village of Støle. It is the church for the Levangsheia parish which is part of the Bamble prosti (deanery) in the Diocese of Agder og Telemark. The white, wooden church was built in a long church design in 1892 using plans drawn up by the architect Adolf Schirmer. The church seats about 215 people.

History
In 1888, the people living in the Levangsheia area requested that an annex chapel be built so they could have a place closer to them, but this request was rejected. The people raised money on their own and persuaded a member of the Storting to support the idea, so the matter was finally approved. The new chapel was designed by Adolf Schirmer and it was built in 1892. The new building was consecrated on 6 September 1892 by the bishop. Originally, it was named Levangsheien Chapel. In the late 1900s, the chapel was upgraded to a parish church and it was renamed Støle Church.

See also
List of churches in Agder og Telemark

References

Kragerø
Churches in Vestfold og Telemark
Long churches in Norway
Wooden churches in Norway
19th-century Church of Norway church buildings
Churches completed in 1892
1892 establishments in Norway